Sigmund Freud University (SFU) is a private and for-profit university accredited by the Austrian Accreditation Council in August 2005 located in Vienna, Austria. As a university in the field of Human Sciences, SFU specializes in Psychotherapy Science, Psychology, Medicine (since 2015), and Law (since 2016). Professor Alfred Pritz serves as Director of Sigmund Freud University, and Professor Giselher Guttmann serves as Academic Dean.

Psychotherapy Science as an academic discipline

Sigmund Freud University pioneered the study of Psychotherapy Science as an academic degree. This program approaches Psychotherapy by emphasizing research activities, practical training, and academic exchange among different psychotherapy schools. Sigmund Freud University is one of the only academic institutions in the world, where Psychotherapy is taught at an undergraduate level.

The Faculty of Psychotherapy Sciences at Sigmund Freud University offers the Bachelor's, Master's, and Doctoral Programs in Psychotherapy Science, as well as psychotherapy training in a variety of methods, including Behaviour Therapy, Psychoanalysis, Individual Psychology, Gestalt, Person-centred Psychotherapy and Systemic Family Therapy.

Key members of faculty at Sigmund Freud University include:  Prof. Alfred Pritz, Prof. Giselher Guttmann, Prof. Bernd Rieken, Dr. Elisabeth Vykoukal, Dr. Brigitte Sindelar, Prof. Felix de Mendelssohn, Prof. Raphael M. Bonelli, Dr. Gerhard Benetka, Dr. Johannes Reichmayr, Dr. Jutta Fiegl, Mag. Eva Pritz, Heinz Laubreuter, Prof. Thomas Druyen, Dr. Omar Gelo, Dr. Albina Colden, Dr. Diana Braakmann, Dr. Werner Gruber and Mag. Stefan Hampl.

All degree programmes in Psychotherapy Science are offered in German and in English. Dr. Elisabeth Vykoukal serves as the Dean of English-taught Bachelor's and Master's Programmes. She is supported by the Head of International Programmes, Dr. Albina Colden.

Sigmund Freud University hosts the annual International Summer School in Psychotherapy—an intensive, four-week program in the fundamentals of psychotherapy theory and practice for students and professionals from around the world.

The Eastern European Institute at Sigmund Freud University was established in 2008, with the goals to aid in the development of the field of Psychotherapy in Eastern European nations, and to establish a Psychotherapy Research Center that deals specifically with Eastern European issues.

One of the research focuses at Sigmund Freud University Vienna is Messies, being primarily researched by Dr. Elisabeth Vykoukal. Messies is related to "Hoarding". It comes from the word mess. It describes those who can't use their home as a place for relaxation after taking part in everyday tasks such as a job. Messies may gather things until their home is so full, that there is barely any room for the messies themselves. Messies may also fail at necessary tasks such as cleaning and handling food, clothing, and laundry.

Psychology

The Bachelor's Programme in Psychology is at this time offered in German and Italy only. Prof. Gerhard Benetka serves as the Head of the Psychology Programme.

Outpatient clinic

The Sigmund Freud University Outpatient Clinic provides Psychotherapy services in German and English. There are currently 50 registered psychotherapists and about 100 supervised students at the clinic.

Security research

With the CEUSS | Center for European Security Studies, led by Prof. Dr. Alexander Siedschlag, SFU has as well assumed a leading role in establishing Security Research as an academic subject and has so far taken part in four security research projects co-funded within the 7th EU Framework Programme, including the flagship project FOCUS that supports scenario foresight-based planning of future security research, with an emphasis on societal an ethics aspects. Within the framework of SFU as a university for humanities, CEUSS in particular contributes to the strengthening of social and cultural aspects and security culture as an analytical approach.

Admission requirements

The following are admission requirements found on the University of Vienna website. To enter a Bachelor's program, a person requires a University entrance certificate. This is equivalent to a High School Diploma. Also, one must write a university entrance exam, which is equivalent to the American SATs or Austrian Studienberechtigungsprüfung. If chosen as a candidate, one must take part in two admission interviews. The interviewers are two individuals from Sigmund Freud University scientific staff (who decide whether the candidate will be admitted or not). The candidate will participate in an admission seminar as well.

References 

 SFU
 Psychology Programme at SFU
 SFU Milano

Publications 
 Slunecko, T., Przyborski, A. & Benetka, G. (2006). Psychology curriculae and the challenge of Bologna: An answer from a cultural science perspective.
 ''Wanted in Europe": The Sigmund Freud University (SFU) of Psychotherapy in Vienna is to launch a full programme of degree and non-degree courses taught and supported entirely in English. Accredited as a private university by the Austrian Accreditation Council in 2005, the SFU at 9 Schnirchgasse is the first university worldwide to offer comprehensive programmes in the science of psychotherapy.

Universities and colleges in Vienna
Private universities and colleges in Austria
Educational institutions established in 2005
2005 establishments in Austria